Aaron Clauset is an American computer scientist who works in the areas of Network Science, Machine Learning, and Complex Systems. He is currently a professor of computer science at the University of Colorado Boulder and is external faculty at the Santa Fe Institute.

Education
Clauset completed his undergraduate studies in physics and computer science at Haverford College in 2001. He earned his Ph.D. in Computer Science in 2006 from the University of New Mexico under the supervision of Cristopher Moore. He was then an Omidyar Fellow at the Santa Fe Institute until 2010.

Career
In 2010, he joined the University of Colorado Boulder as an assistant professor, with primary appointments in the Computer Science Department and the BioFrontiers Institute, an interdisciplinary institute focused on quantitative systems biology. He joined the founding editorial board of Science Advances as an Associate Editor in 2014, and became the Deputy Editor responsible for social and interdisciplinary sciences in 2017. In 2018, he was awarded tenure and promoted to associate professor at the University of Colorado Boulder.

Clauset is best known for work done with Cosma Shalizi and Mark Newman on developing rigorous statistics tests for the presence of a power law pattern in empirical data, and for showing that many distributions that were claimed to be power laws actually were not. He is also known for his work on developing algorithms for detecting community structure in complex networks, particularly a model of hierarchical clustering in networks developed with Cristopher Moore and Mark Newman. In other work, Clauset is known for his specific discovery, with Maxwell Young and Kristian Skrede Gleditsch, that the frequency and severity of terrorist events worldwide follows a power-law distribution. This discovery was summarized by Nate Silver in his popular science book The Signal and the Noise.

In January 2020, Clauset's work on scale-free networks and the distribution of terrorist events garnered public attention after two of his papers were cited in the blog of British political advisor Dominic Cummings. The blog post was released as part of an advertisement searching for "data scientists, project managers, policy experts, assorted weirdos", with Clauset's papers being cited as examples of work potential candidates should be aware of for use in public policy. In response, Clauset stated that the "paper on scale-free networks is not directly relevant to government policy … Cummings is using our paper as an example of using careful statistical and computational analyses of large and diverse data sets to reassess ideas that may be accepted as conventional wisdom." Clauset added that "in many cases, we don’t understand causality well enough to formulate a policy that will not do more damage than good."

Awards and honors
In 2015, Clauset received a prestigious CAREER Award from the National Science Foundation to develop and evaluate new methods for characterizing the structure of networks. In 2016, Clauset received the Erdös-Rényi Prize in Network Science from the Network Science Society for his contributions to the study of network structure, including Internet mapping, inference of missing links, and community structure, and for his provocative analyses of human conflicts and social stratification.

Personal life
Aaron Clauset was a contestant on the fourth season of the NBC reality television show Average Joe: The Joe Strikes Back, which aired in 2005. From 2002 to 2016, he wrote a blog Structure+Strangeness on science, complex systems, and computation.

Selected publications
.
.
.
.
.
.
.

References

External links
Home page at the Santa Fe Institute
Citations in Google Scholar

Living people
American computer scientists
Haverford College alumni
University of New Mexico alumni
University of Colorado Boulder faculty
Science bloggers
Santa Fe Institute people
Year of birth missing (living people)
Network scientists